Ludwig Schödl (31 October 1909 – 20 February 1997), born in Berlin, was an advocate of the Workers' Esperanto Movement in Germany as well as abroad between the 1920s and the 1930s. In the second post war, he strongly supported and influenced in the process of restoration of the Esperanto Movement in the German Democratic Republic, and became one of its mainstream militants.

He supported the Esperanto's diffusion among the children, and was a prolific writer, which allowed him to have registered the first Esperanto textbook issued in the GDR and published by the state: the famous Wir lernen Esperanto sprechen. In the same way, he organized correspondence courses, wrote songbooks, multiple conferences and abundant translations from German to Esperanto. He died in Neuruppin in 1997.

Notable works

Wir lernen Esperanto sprechen: ein Taschenlehrbuch, Zentraler Arbeitskreis Esperanto der DDR im Dt. Kulturbund, 1972. 145 pp
Esperanto-Fernstudium: in 14 Lektionen, Kulturbund der DDR, Esperanto-Verb., 1983. 56 pp

References
 Fritz Wollenberg, S. Hartwign, Intervjuo kun Ludwig Schödl. Interview mit Ludwig Schödl, Arbeitsgruppe zur Erforschung der Geschichte des E-Verbandes im Kulturbund der DDR, Berlin, 2008. 48 pp. 

German Esperantists
1909 births
1997 deaths
Translators to German
East German culture
Writers from Berlin
20th-century German translators
German male non-fiction writers